Robert Woods (born July 19, 1936), sometimes credited as Robert Wood, is an American film and television actor. He is noted for extensive work in Spaghetti Westerns and in the European film industry in the 1960s and 1970s. His numerous credits include parts in over 50 films, including 42 in which he was top-billed.

Biography

Robert Woods was born on July 19, 1936, in Colorado. He began his film career after being selected by George Hamilton to be his stand-in in Where the Boys Are (1960) where he had an uncredited role.

Partial filmography

 Where the Boys Are (1960)
 Battle of the Bulge (1965)
 Five Thousand Dollars on One Ace (1965)
 Man from Canyon City (1965)
 Four Dollars for Vengeance (1966)
 Seven Guns for the MacGregors (1966)
 My Name Is Pecos (1967)
 Massacre Mania (1967)
 Pecos Cleans Up (1967)
 The Belle Starr Story (1968)
 Captain Singrid (1968)
 Gatling Gun (1968)
 The Young Tigers of Hong Kong (1969)
 The Reward's Yours... The Man's Mine (1969)
 Savage Guns (1971)
 Lucifera Demon Lover (1972)
 Kill the Poker Player (1972)
 White Fang and the Hunter (1975)

References

External links
  

American male film actors
Living people
1936 births
Male Spaghetti Western actors
Male actors from Colorado